John Richard DeGiuli (born October 20, 1961), known as Johnnie Dee, is a Canadian rock vocalist best known as the lead singer for the rock band Honeymoon Suite.  Dee (who also plays guitar) and guitarist Derry Grehan formed Honeymoon Suite in Niagara Falls, Ontario in the early 1980s.  Together they produced five studio albums and numerous hits including songs such as "New Girl Now" and "Feel It Again" which were both featured on the Miami Vice TV series. In 1986, Honeymoon Suite won a Juno Award for "Group of the Year" and was also nominated that same year for "Album of the Year".

In 2004, Dee released a solo album entitled Songs in Dee, which was produced independently in Canada. Most of the tracks were co-written with Rob Laidlaw who also produced the album.  A single for "Out Here" was released, with a corresponding music video.

References
Honeymoon Suite biography at LiveTourArtists

External links
Official Band Website

1961 births
Canadian hard rock musicians
Canadian male guitarists
Canadian people of Italian descent
Canadian rock guitarists
Canadian rock singers
Glam metal musicians
Living people
Musicians from Montreal